College Hockey America (CHA) is a National Collegiate Athletic Association (NCAA) Division I ice hockey-only conference based in Detroit, Michigan that was formed in mid-1999 after the dissolution of Division II ice hockey. CHA was originally a men's and women's ice hockey conference, but has been a women's-only conference since 2010 when Niagara and Robert Morris joined Atlantic Hockey, Bemidji State joined the Western Collegiate Hockey Association, and Alabama–Huntsville became an independent school. After the completion of each regular season, it held the CHA Men's Ice Hockey Tournament to determine its men's conference champion. In 2001, CHA commissioned the Bruce M. McLeod Trophy, named after its first commissioner, which was awarded to the tournament champion. In 2003, CHA was granted an annual automatic bid to the NCAA Men's Ice Hockey Championship for its tournament champion. Before this, the only CHA team to have played in the national championship tournament was Niagara, which received an at-large bid into the 2000 tournament. No CHA team won a national championship, and until 2009, Niagara was the only CHA team to have advanced past the first round. In the 2009 tournament, Bemidji State became the only CHA team and 16th ranked seed to ever advance to the Frozen Four.

Eleven CHA Men's Ice Hockey Tournaments were held during the existence of CHA. The tournament was first hosted at the Von Braun Center in Huntsville, Alabama and was won by Niagara. Bemidji State, Niagara, and Wayne State won the most CHA Men's Ice Hockey Tournaments, with three each. Alabama–Huntsville and Bemidji State had the most championship game appearances, with six each. Bill Wilkinson and Tom Serratore coached three championship teams, more than any other CHA coaches. Tom Serratore had the most championship game appearances as a coach, with six. Dwyer Arena in Lewiston, New York hosted the tournament three times, more than any other venue.

Champions

Appearances
 indicates tournament champion

Notes
  Each year is linked to an article about the CHA tournament for that year.

References

General

Specific

 
College ice hockey in the United States lists